Sebastian Luke Negri da Oleggio (born 30 June 1994) is a Zimbabwean-born Italian professional rugby union player who primarily plays flanker for Benetton of the United Rugby Championship. He has also represented Italy at international level, having made his test debut against the United States during the 2016 Summer Internationals. Negri has previously played for clubs such as Sharks and Western Province in the past.

Professional career 
Negri was born in Marondera, Zimbabwe and has three siblings – two brothers and a sister. He attended Springvale House in Zimbabwe before moving to South Africa, where he attended Clifton Preparatory School before moving to Hilton College on a sports scholarship. After school, he joined the Western Province Academy, and played for them in the 2013 Under-19 Provincial Championship, before moving to England to study sports business management at Hartpury College.

Negri represented Italy Under-20 nine times in 2013 and 2014 and progressed to the Emerging Italy team in 2015. On 18 June 2016, Negri made his debut for the Italian national team in a victory over the United States in San Jose.

Negri signed a two-year deal with Italian Pro14 side Benetton prior to the 2017–2018 season.

On 18 August 2019, Negri was named in the final 31-man squad for the 2019 Rugby World Cup.

Early life 
Negri was born in Marondera – where his family owned a farm – to a Milanese father and an Anglo-Zimbabwean mother, who was the godmother of future Scotland international David Denton.

Negri started playing rugby at the age of 6 at school in Zimbabwe, but his family fell victim to Robert Mugabe's expropriations against the country's white landowners. This prompted them to leave the country and move to Durban, South Africa.

Originally a fly half, as Negri grew in height he moved to the second row and then became a flanker. He passed through the ranks at the youth teams of Natal and Western Province, and was noticed by Roland de Marigny, a former Italian-South African player, who recommended him to the Italian Federation. He was called up for the Italian Under-20s and took part in the 2013 World Youth Trophy in Chile, which Italy won.

In 2014, Negri moved to the United Kingdom, studying at Hartpury College, Gloucestershire, where he joined the rugby team. In 2016, while still in college, he made his debut for the Italian national team in San Jose against the United States.

After university, Negri was signed by Benetton Treviso for the Pro14 2017–18 season. In 2018 he was used throughout the Six Nations, participating in all five matches. More recently, he was part of the Italian team at the 2019 World Cup in Japan.

References

External links 

1994 births
Zimbabwean rugby union players
Italian rugby union players
Zimbabwean people of Italian descent
Living people
Italy international rugby union players
Alumni of Hartpury College
Benetton Rugby players
Alumni of Hilton College (South Africa)
Rugby union locks